Byellee is a suburb of Gladstone in the Gladstone Region, Queensland, Australia.

Geography 
The suburb is bounded to the west and north by the Calliope River.

History 
The suburb takes its name from the corrupted pronunciation of name of an Aboriginal clan resident on Curtis Island and the mainland north of the Calliope River. Byellee was used as an alternative to Boyne Valley during World War II by the Queensland Railways Department.

References 

Suburbs of Gladstone